Rooty Hill railway station is located on the Main Western line, serving the Sydney suburb of Rooty Hill. It is served by Sydney Trains T1 Western line services.

History
Rooty Hill station opened on 23 December 1861 as the terminus of the Main Western line when it was extended from Blacktown. On 1 May 1862, the line was extended to St Marys. The station was rebuilt in the 1940s.

Upgrades
From late December 2019 to early January 2020, Rooty Hill saw the completion of an upgrade to the station, including a brand new Footbridge with 4 lifts.

Platforms & services

Transport links
Busways operates three routes via Rooty Hill station:
738: to Eastern Creek
756: Mount Druitt station to Blacktown station
757: Mount Druitt station to Riverstone station

References

External links

Rooty Hill station details Transport for New South Wales

Easy Access railway stations in Sydney
Railway stations in Australia opened in 1861
Main Western railway line, New South Wales
Railway stations in Sydney
Rooty Hill, New South Wales